Hyskeir Lighthouse was established in 1904. The  metre high lighthouse marks the southern end of the Minch, warning of the presence of the Mills Rocks, Canna, and Hyskeir itself. It was designed by David and Charles Stevenson and constructed by Oban contractor Messrs D & J MacDougall.

The white tower was manned until March 1997, becoming one of the last lighthouses in Scotland to be automated. The keepers were briefly known for their one-hole golf course following their appearance on TV. Now controlled by the Northern Lighthouse Board in Edinburgh, it displays three white flashes every thirty seconds.

Hyskeir and its lighthouse feature extensively in Peter Hill's book Stargazing: Memoirs of a Young Lighthouse Keeper.

See also

 List of lighthouses in Scotland
 List of Northern Lighthouse Board lighthouses

References

External links
 
 Northern Lighthouse Board

Lighthouses completed in 1904
Lighthouses of Scottish islands
Small Isles, Lochaber